Monique Dupree (born December 10, 1974), nicknamed "Tha True Original GATA", is an American actress, wrestling talent, singer, content creator and entrepreneur. As an actress, she is best known for her role as Emerald in Bachelor Party in the Bungalow of the Damned and as a shower girl in Return to Return to Nuke 'Em High AKA Volume 2. She is best known for her time as a wrestling talent / producer / social media manager for  Tommy Dreamer's company, House of Hardcore. Dubbed "The Heart and Soul of House of Hardcore" for her hard work on camera and behind the scenes on numerous occasions via their Twitch stream by Dreamer, whom she also had a relationship with for an undetermined amount of years. She has also done appearances on Impact Wrestling.

Personal life 
Dupree was born in Newark, New Jersey. She is married to published author Anthony Saint Thomas and they have 10 children together.
Monique has been involved in many grass root charities, but nothing has been more important than helping other children who have lost their way. She’s raised dozens of other children, not including her own.

Career 
Her film career began at the age of 14, when she appeared in the 1989 Morgan Freeman film Lean On Me, about school principal Joe Clark. It was then that she realized that she wanted to pursue acting as a career. By the age of 18, she had done numerous stage productions, including the play Cry of the People by Robert Banks.

Dupree's experience also included her having worked as a model. In working with Troma Entertainment in films, she was the first African American "Tromette," and the first to be a Tromette twice. She appeared in numerous magazines across the world, including The Autograph Collector Magazine and Primera Linea. She also worked as a comicbook model. In Gingerstein: Rise of the Undead, she acted out the character of Edie Van Horne.

Dupree is lead singer of the musical team Negro Childe.

Filmography

Film / Video

Wrestling

Television / TV Movies

References

External links
 Official site

 Youtube

1974 births
Living people
21st-century American actresses
American film actresses
American stage actresses
African-American actresses
Actresses from Newark, New Jersey
Musicians from Newark, New Jersey
African-American women musicians
21st-century African-American women
20th-century African-American people
20th-century African-American women